The Democratic National Salvation Front (FDSN) was a Romanian political party formed by former President Ion Iliescu and his supporters stemming from the National Salvation Front (FSN) on 7 April 1992. It was the result of the breakup of the previously ruling FSN during the early 1990s. 

The smaller wing led by Petre Roman continued using the brand FSN. On 10 July 1993, the FDSN merged with the Romanian Socialist Democratic Party (PSDR), the Republican Party, and the Cooperative Party, creating the Party of Social Democracy in Romania (PDSR). In 2001, PDSR merged with PSDR to create the present-day Social Democratic Party (PSD).

Election history

Legislative elections

Presidential elections

See also
1992 Romanian general election

1992 establishments in Romania
1993 disestablishments in Romania
Conservative parties in Romania
Defunct conservative parties
Defunct social democratic parties
Defunct socialist parties in Romania
Political parties disestablished in 1993
Political parties established in 1992
Social conservative parties
Social democratic parties in Romania
Social Democratic Party (Romania)